Elizabeth Anne Carriere  is a former British civil servant working in international development. From 2015 to 2018, she served as Governor of Montserrat.

Biography 
Carriere has an MSc in Public Policy and Management from the University of London and has studied the sociology of adult education at the University of British Columbia and anthropology at the University of Manitoba. Like her predecessor as governor, Adrian Davis, Carriere was a senior civil servant with the Department for International Development (DFID). She was posted to DFID Indonesia, and has subsequently served as head of DFID in Jamaica, Bangladesh, the Caribbean regional office, Rwanda, and South Sudan.

In March 2015, it was announced that Carriere would succeed Adrian Davis as Governor of Montserrat. She is the second female governor after Deborah Barnes-Jones (2004–2007). Carriere was sworn in at Government House on 5 August 2015. In August 2017, she announced that she would resign from her post as Governor and from the British civil service in early January 2018 to take up an international development position in Africa with a non-governmental organization. The British Government announced that she would be replaced by Andrew Pearce.

After leaving her role in Montserrat, Carriere went on to take up the position of Managing Deputy Regional Director for the Great Lakes of Central Africa with CARE, a leading humanitarian organisation. Carriere led the country operations in Uganda, Rwanda, DRC and Burundi.

References

Year of birth missing (living people)
Living people
Governors of Montserrat
Civil servants in the Department for International Development
Officers of the Order of the British Empire
Alumni of the University of London
University of Manitoba alumni